Vikramabahu III was King of Gampola who ruled from 1357 to 1374. He succeeded his Uncle Parakramabahu V as King of Gampola and was succeeded by his nephew Bhuvanaikabahu V.

See also
 List of Sri Lankan monarchs
 History of Sri Lanka

References

External links
 Kings & Rulers of Sri Lanka
 Codrington's Short History of Ceylon

Monarchs of Gampola
House of Siri Sanga Bo
V
V